Robert Thompson Batley (15 November 1849 – 14 July 1917) was a New Zealand seaman, farm worker, storekeeper and sheep farmer. He was born in Great Yarmouth, Norfolk, England on 15 November 1849.

References

1849 births
1917 deaths
New Zealand farmers
English emigrants to New Zealand
People from Great Yarmouth